Buffalo Lake is a lake in South Dakota, in the United States.

Buffalo Lake was so named on account of the lake being a natural habitat of buffalo fish.

See also
List of lakes in South Dakota

References

Lakes of South Dakota
Lakes of Minnehaha County, South Dakota